The 1892–93 Irish Cup was the thirteenth edition of the premier knock-out cup competition in Irish football.

Linfield won the tournament for the third time and third year in a row, defeating Cliftonville 5–1 in the final.

Results
Linfield, Distillery, Ulster, Glentoran, St Columb's Court, Limavady, Derry Olympic, Leinster Nomads and Cliftonville all given byes into the third round.

First round

|}

Second round

|}

Third round

|}

1 Ulster protested after the match that Rosemount's ground did not provide sufficient protection to the players from spectators. The match was ordered to be replayed at Ulster's ground, but Rosemount refused to play feeling they had been harshly treated. Ulster therefore advanced into the next round.

Fourth round

|}

Replay

|}

Fifth round

|}

Semi-finals

|}

1 A replay was ordered after a protest.

Replay

|}

Final

References

External links
 Northern Ireland Cup Finals. Rec.Sport.Soccer Statistics Foundation (RSSSF)

Irish Cup seasons
1892–93 domestic association football cups
1892–93 in Irish association football